James McBrine (born 16 September 1963 in Omagh, County Tyrone, Northern Ireland) is an Irish former cricketer. A right-handed batsman and right-arm medium pace bowler, he played just once for the Ireland cricket team, a first-class match against Scotland in August 1986. His twin brother Alexander and nephew Andy also played cricket for Ireland.

References

1963 births
Living people
Irish cricketers
People from Omagh
Twin sportspeople
Irish twins
Cricketers from Northern Ireland